Ali bin Abdullah bin Jassim bin Mohammed Al Thani, KBE (5 June 1895 – 31 August 1974) was the Emir of Qatar. Sheikh Ali is also known as the first Emir of Qatar to have migrated and traveled abroad, visiting India, Egypt, Europe, Lebanon and the Levant.

Biography

Early life and reign
Sheikh Ali bin Abdullah Al Thani was born on 25 June 1895, in Doha. His father was Sheikh Abdullah bin Jassim Al Thani. He had a younger brother, Sheikh Hamad bin Abdullah Al Thani, and a half brother, Sheikh Hassan bin Abdullah Al Thani.

He became the emir of Qatar on 20 August 1949. He is also known as the first emir of Qatar to have visited other countries abroad. His reign also saw emphasis on education and infrastructure. After his abdication, he lived a few years in Qatar during which he was very sociable in befriending many Muslim scholars.

Events during his rule
During his reign, Sheikh Ali oversaw the very first shipment of onshore Qatari oil from the port city in Mesaieed on 31 December 1949, marking Qatar's entry into the oil age.

Aside from overseeing the first shipment of oil in Qatar, Sheikh Ali's reign saw the establishment of the first regular school for boys, the first regular school for girls, the funding of university places and the construction of the very first permanent hospital. In addition to these, Sheikh Ali also oversaw the construction of the Doha International Airport, several road networks, and water, electricity and port facilities. He also established additional government departments and ministries as well as the first joint stock companies. Ronald Cochrane was made responsible for organizing the police force in Qatar. Phillip Plant, a former British Royal Air Force officer, was appointed in January 1950, as adviser to the emir. In the same year, in August 1950, Britain appointed Arthur John Wilton as the first Political Officer in Qatar.

On 1 September 1952, a new treaty was also signed between Sheikh Ali and the Iraq Petroleum Company (later Qatar Petroleum Company). Under the terms of these agreements, Qatar acquired 50% of profits from oil exports. In line with the exploration of oil in Qatar, Sheikh Ali took steps to establish an effective administrative system to manage the rising economy of oil. After befriending numerous Muslim scholars after his abdication, he started printing many historical Islamic books that were never printed before; these were printed in the Almaktab Alislami in Lebanon.

Numerous protests during the mid 1950s were directed at Sheikh Ali. In the early 1950s, there were many protests by dissatisfied oil workers aimed towards the oil companies. He acted as a mediator for discussions between oil companies and demonstrators. By 1956, protests appeared in Doha and started displaying a more hostile attitude towards the emir. One of the largest protests took place that year; it drew 2,000 participants, most of whom were oil workers and high-ranking Qataris allied with Arab nationalists.

In May 1960, a cousin of Sheikh Ali attempted to assassinate him with a firearm at the sheikh's holiday residence in Beirut. The assassination attempt was allegedly related to finances. 
He abdicated in favor of Ahmad bin Ali Al Thani on 28 October 1960.

Marriage and children
Sheikh Ali bin Abdullah Al Thani married two wives: Sheikha Hamda Al-Thani and Sheikha Maryam bint Abdullah Al Attiyah. He has 14 children, 11 sons and 3 daughters. 
Note that this list is in descending order according to their age, from the eldest son to the youngest. Same is true with the daughters.
Sheikh Qassim bin Ali Al Thani
Sheikh Ahmad bin Ali Al Thani
Sheikh Muhammed bin Ali Al Thani
Sheikh Fahad bin Ali Al Thani
Sheikh Khalifa bin Ali Al Thani
Sheikh Ghanim bin Ali Al Thani
Sheikh Hamad bin Ali Al Thani
Sheikh Abdullah bin Ali Al Thani
Sheikh Khalid bin Ali Al Thani
Sheikh Abdulrahman bin Ali Al Thani
Sheikh Al Waleed bin Ali Al Thani
Sheikha Mariam bint Ali Al Thani (1942 – 21 May 2014)
Sheikha Bothaina bint Ali Al-Thani
Sheikha Mauza bint Ali Al-Thani

Note: we don’t know much about most of his children’s lives, infact we don’t even have definitive information about their marriages or children.

Death
Sheikh Ali became diabetic in later years and lived in his home in Lebanon where he was taken care of by Nasib Albarbir. He died afterwards in the Barbir Hospital in Beirut on 31 August 1974. His body was then flown back to Qatar where he was buried in a cemetery at the municipality of Al Rayyan.

References

External links
The Al Thani Family Tree, offered in Arabic
Official Page in The Al Thani Family Tree

1895 births
1974 deaths
Emirs of Qatar
House of Thani
Honorary Knights Commander of the Order of the British Empire
20th-century Arabs